A spire is a conical or pyramidal structure tapering at the top of a building.

Spires or The Spires may also refer to:

Places

Geography
Speyer (formerly Spires in English), a city in Germany
The Spires (Tasmania), a mountain range in the South West Wilderness, Tasmania, Australia

Buildings and structures
The Spires (Houston), thirty-ninth tallest skyscraper in Houston, Texas completed in 1983
 The Spires, a commercial conference centre, operated out of Church House, Belfast by the Presbyterian Church in Ireland
 The Spires Shopping Centre, a shopping centre in Chipping Barnet, north London, England

People
Arthur "Big Boy" Spires (1912–1990), an American blues singer and guitarist
Elizabeth Spires (born 1952), an American poet and university professor
Greg Spires (born 1974), a former American football defensive end in the National Football League
Jamie Spires (born 1976), an English cricketer
Kit Spires (born 1954), an American politician
Nick Spires (born 1994), an English-Swedish basketball player

Education
Oxford Spires Academy, a state funded secondary school for children aged 11–18 in Glanville Road, East Oxford
Spires Academy, a secondary school for students aged 11–16 in Canterbury, Kent
The Spires College, a mixed secondary school and sixth form located in the Devon town of Torquay, England

Other uses
SPIRES (Stanford Physics Information Retrieval System}, a database for publications in High-Energy Physics
Saint Mary Spires, the athletic teams that represent the University of Saint Mary in Leavenworth, Kansas

See also 
 Spire (disambiguation)